The 2000 Houston Cougars football team, also known as the Houston Cougars, Houston, or UH represented the University of Houston in the 2000 NCAA Division I-A football season.  It was the 55th year of season play for Houston. The team was coached by Dana Dimel.  The team played its home games at Robertson Stadium, a 32,000-person capacity stadium on-campus in Houston.

Schedule

Roster

References

Houston
Houston Cougars football seasons
Houston Cougars football